Taylor Township may refer to:

Canada
 Taylor Township, Cochrane District, Ontario

United States

Arkansas
 Taylor Township, Columbia County, Arkansas, in Columbia County, Arkansas
 Taylor Township, Craighead County, Arkansas, in Craighead County, Arkansas
 Taylor Township, Nevada County, Arkansas, in Nevada County, Arkansas

Illinois
 Taylor Township, Ogle County, Illinois

Indiana
 Taylor Township, Greene County, Indiana
 Taylor Township, Harrison County, Indiana
 Taylor Township, Howard County, Indiana
 Taylor Township, Owen County, Indiana

Iowa
 Taylor Township, Allamakee County, Iowa
 Taylor Township, Appanoose County, Iowa
 Taylor Township, Benton County, Iowa
 Taylor Township, Dubuque County, Iowa, in Dubuque County, Iowa
 Taylor Township, Harrison County, Iowa
 Taylor Township, Marshall County, Iowa

Michigan
 Taylor Township, Michigan, defunct

Minnesota
 Taylor Township, Beltrami County, Minnesota
 Taylor Township, Traverse County, Minnesota

Missouri
 Taylor Township, Greene County, Missouri, in Greene County, Missouri
 Taylor Township, Grundy County, Missouri
 Taylor Township, Shelby County, Missouri
 Taylor Township, Sullivan County, Missouri, in Sullivan County, Missouri

North Dakota
 Taylor Township, Sargent County, North Dakota, in Sargent County, North Dakota

Ohio
 Taylor Township, Union County, Ohio

Oklahoma
 Taylor Township, Cleveland County, Oklahoma

Pennsylvania
 Taylor Township, Blair County, Pennsylvania
 Taylor Township, Centre County, Pennsylvania
 Taylor Township, Fulton County, Pennsylvania
 Taylor Township, Lawrence County, Pennsylvania

South Dakota
 Taylor Township, Hanson County, South Dakota, in Hanson County, South Dakota
 Taylor Township, Tripp County, South Dakota, in Tripp County, South Dakota

See also
Taylor (disambiguation)

Township name disambiguation pages